Thomas Fabbiano (born 26 May 1989) is an Italian former tennis who player played mostly on the ATP Challenger Tour. On 11 September 2017, he reached his then-highest ATP singles ranking of 70. His highest doubles ranking was 208 on 20 July 2009.

He reached his first third round at a Grand Slam tournament at the US Open 2017 where he was defeated by fellow italian Paolo Lorenzi. Since then he reached the second round or better at each of the Grand Slams including the 2019 Wimbledon Championships where he stunned seventh seed Stefanos Tsitsipas in the first round.

Junior grand slam finals

Doubles finals: 1 (1–0)

ATP Challenger and ITF Futures finals

Singles: 25 (17–8)

Doubles

Performance timelines

Singles

Current through the 2022 Australian Open.

Wins over top 10 players

References

External links
 
 

1989 births
Living people
Sportspeople from the Province of Taranto
Italian male tennis players
Olympic tennis players of Italy
Tennis players at the 2016 Summer Olympics
French Open junior champions
Grand Slam (tennis) champions in boys' doubles